Pedro Luis Díaz Lanz (July 8, 1926 in Havana, Cuba – June 26, 2008 Miami, U.S.) was Chief of the Revolutionary Air Force of Cuba under Fidel Castro, before and after the 1959 Cuban Revolution.

Life in Cuba
In 1957, Pedro Díaz Lanz joined Fidel Castro's rebel group in Santiago, Cuba. He was employed as a commercial pilot with the airline Aerovías Q. He later acted as head of the Revolutionary Air Force, and during 1958 he smuggled weapons and ammunition from Costa Rica and Florida into Cuba by air.

After the Cuban Revolution on 1 January 1959, he was confirmed as head of the new Revolutionary Air Force as well as Castro's personal pilot. Within months, he became vocal about his opposition to the influence of communists on the new revolutionary government. On 29 June 1959, Fidel Castro relieved him of his post, and he left immediately by boat for Florida with his second wife and 3 of his six children, and reportedly with Frank Sturgis, a fellow anti-communist.

Life after Cuba

On 14 July 1959, Díaz was interviewed by the US Senate Internal Security subcommittee, where he gave out the first account of Fidel's planned move towards communism.

On 21 October 1959 he carried out one of his most notorious acts, flying a twin-engined bomber (variously reported as a B-25 or B-26) over Havana while dropping anti-communist leaflets, along with his brother Marcos Diaz Lanz. Pedro Diaz Lanz piloted and Marcos Diaz Lanz threw the leaflets down from an open bomb hatch. The unsuccessful gunfire from armed forces on the ground caused injuries and deaths, leading to unsubstantiated reports of bombs being dropped from the aircraft.

By April 1960, he was recruited by the CIA and became a member of Operation 40, a group of CIA operatives who specialized in carrying out secret anti-Castro assassinations and acts of sabotage. Then on May 27 of 1960, the Miami Herald published a list of names of pilots who were placed on a U.S. Government 'Blacklist' thereby prohibiting them from flying to Cuba; on that list was Pedro Luis Diaz Lanz.

Díaz committed suicide with a gunshot wound to the chest in 2008 at the age of 81 after years of poverty and depression.

Notes

See also 
 Manuel Artime

External links
Judiciary Hearings of Communist Threats to America Through the Caribbean
TIME Magazine: Towards Dictatorship
The Political End of "President" Urrutia
WILFREDO CANCIO ISLA. Se suicida legendario piloto anticastrista. El Nuevo Herald June 28, 2008.

1926 births
2008 suicides
Cuban emigrants to the United States
Suicides by firearm in Florida
Commercial aviators